Montcalm is a federal electoral district in Quebec, Canada, which has been represented in the House of Commons of Canada from 1867 to 1917 and since 2004.

In the 2004 election, the Bloc Québécois won a larger percentage of the vote than in any other riding, with 71% of the vote. It held the seat until 2011, when it was defeated by the NDP.

Geography

The riding is located to the northeast of the Montreal region, in the Quebec region of Lanaudière. It consists of the Montcalm RCM, the city of Mascouche, and the districts of La Plaine and Lachenaie in the city of Terrebonne.

The neighbouring ridings are Joliette, Repentigny, La Pointe-de-l'Île, Honoré-Mercier, Alfred-Pellan, Terrebonne—Blainville, and Rivière-du-Nord.

History

Montcalm riding was created by the British North America Act of 1867. It was abolished in 1914 when it was merged into L'Assomption—Montcalm riding.

It was re-created in 2003 from parts of Berthier—Montcalm, Repentigny and Terrebonne—Blainville ridings.

This riding lost territory to Terrebonne and gained some territory from Repentigny during the 2012 electoral redistribution.

Members of Parliament

This riding has elected the following Members of Parliament:

Election results

2004–present

1867–1917

See also
 List of Canadian federal electoral districts
 Past Canadian electoral districts

References

 Campaign expense data from Elections Canada
Riding history 1867-1914 from the Library of Parliament
Riding history 2003-present from the Library of Parliament
2011 Results from Elections Canada

Notes

Quebec federal electoral districts
Mascouche
Terrebonne, Quebec